Blanche of Montferrat (1472 – 30 March 1519) was Duchess of Savoy as the wife of Charles I of Savoy. She acted as regent for her only son Charles from 1490 until his accidental death in 1496.

Marriage 
Blanche was the eldest daughter of Marquess William VIII Palaiologos of Montferrat and Elisabetta Sforza, daughter of Duke Francesco I Sforza of Milan and Bianca Maria Visconti, after whom Blanche was named. Her mother, Elisabetta, died at age 17 when Blanche was less than a year old.

On 1 April 1485, Blanche married Duke Charles I of Savoy. The marriage produced two surviving children:
 A stillborn son (September 1486)
 Yolande Louise of Savoy (2 July 1487 – 13 September 1499), married Philibert II of Savoy; died childless at the age of 12.
 A son (born and died in May 1488)
 Charles II, Duke of Savoy (23 June 1489 – 16 April 1496).
 A daughter (born and died in March 1490)

Regency
After the death of her husband in 1490, Blanche gave birth to her youngest child, who did not survive. She then acted as regent for her young son, Charles, who had succeeded his father in his regnal and titular titles. She remained the ruler of Savoy until her son, who was seven years old at the time, was accidentally killed in a fall at Moncalieri. Her surviving child, Yolande fell ill and died three years later, without having produced any children; therefore Blanche's line became extinct.

In December 1518, Blanche fell seriously ill, possibly with tuberculosis. In her will dated 12 February 1519, she named her choice of burial place which was the chapel of the Church of the Blessed Virgin in Carignano.

References

Sources

Cypriot queens consort
Armenian queens consort
15th-century women rulers
16th-century women rulers
1472 births
1519 deaths
15th century in Cyprus
Regents of Savoy
Duchesses of Savoy
Palaiologos dynasty
15th-century people from Savoy
16th-century people from Savoy